Anton Kuster (born 31 July 1923) is a Swiss sprint canoeist who competed in the early 1950s. At the 1952 Summer Olympics in Helsinki, he was eliminated in the heats of the K-2 1000 m event.

References
Anton Kuster's profile at Sports Reference.com
  

1923 births
Canoeists at the 1952 Summer Olympics
Olympic canoeists of Switzerland
Possibly living people
Swiss male canoeists